Formby Golf Club is a golf links in Formby, Merseyside, England.

History
Founded in 1884, the course was redesigned by Willie Park Jr. in 1912. Over the years the course has undergone some changes, including some in 1922 by James Braid.

Major tournaments hosted
The course has been the venue for a number of tournaments and competitions over the years, including the Curtis Cup in 2004 and The Amateur Championship in 1957, 1967, 1984, and 2009. It has also been used as a qualifying course for The Open Championship in 1924, 1971 and 1996. It hosted the Staysure PGA Seniors Championship in 2021 and 2022 as part of the European Senior Tour.

References

External links
Formby Golf Club
Englands Golf Coast
Article on the 2004 Curtis Cup
Aerial Photograph from MultiMap

Golf clubs and courses in Merseyside
Curtis Cup venues
Sport in the Metropolitan Borough of Sefton
Sports venues completed in 1884
Formby